Yusef Lateef's Little Symphony is an album by Yusef Lateef, released through the record label Rhino Atlantic in 1987. The album, which Billboard described as "an atmospheric four-movement classical/jazz composition", was produced by Lateef, recorded, mixed and mastered by Norman Blain, and remastered by Dennis King. Lateef provided all instrumentation that appears on the album. In 1988, Yusef Lateef's Little Symphony earned Lateef the Grammy Award for Best New Age Album despite having no prior association with the genre.

Composition and reception

Lateef played all of the instruments that appear on Yusef Lateef's Little Symphony, which Billboard described as "an atmospheric four-movement classical/jazz composition". The album was produced by Lateef, recorded, mixed and mastered by Norman Blain, and remastered by Dennis King.

In 1988, the album earned Lateef the Grammy Award for Best New Age Album despite having no prior association with new-age music. Known for disliking the term "jazz", Lateef has stated he has no problem with the New Age classification and believes the genre has no "negative connotations at all".

Track listing 
All songs by Yusef Lateef.

 "First Movement: Larghissimo" – 8:05
 "Second Movement: Andante" – 8:14
 "Third Movement: Moderato" – 10:07
 "Fourth Movement: Presto" – 6:51

Track listing adapted from AllMusic.

Personnel 

 Norman Blain – engineer, mastering, mixing
 Bob Defrin – art direction
 Cheryl Griesbach – illustrations
 Dennis King – remastering
 Yusef Lateef – alto flute, casio, drums, Ensoniq Mirage, flute, gourd, kalangu, producer, soprano flute, soprano saxophone, tenor flute, tenor saxophone, shehnai flute, sitar, water drums
 Stanley Martucci – illustrations

Credits adapted from AllMusic.

See also 

 List of new-age music artists
 List of New Age topics

References 

1987 albums
Grammy Award for Best New Age Album
New-age albums by American artists
Yusef Lateef albums